Ramehpur is a village  near Kawardha in Kabirdham district of Chhattisgarh state of India.

References

Villages in Kabirdham district